Camarón: When Flamenco Became Legend is a 2005 Spanish biopic film directed by Jaime Chávarri from a screenplay by Chávarri and Álvaro del Amo which stars Óscar Jaenada as Camarón de la Isla along with Verónica Sánchez.

Plot 
The plot is a fictionalised version of the life of flamenco singer José Monge Cruz, aka "Camarón de la Isla", depicting his artistic rise and early physical decline.

Cast

Production 
Produced by Monoria Films and Filmanova Invest, the film had the participation of TVE and Telemadrid. Shooting locations included San Fernando.

Release 
The film screened at the 53rd San Sebastián International Film Festival in September 2005. Distributed by Buena Vista International, it was theatrically released in Spain on 4 November 2005.

Reception 
Jonathan Holland of Variety considered that, only "redeemed only by a committed perf from young Oscar Jaenada, a few late flourishes and some, but not enough, terrific music", the "predictable" biopic "is hardly the passionate tribute [Camarón de la Isla's] daring genius deserves", seal of approval from his family notwithstanding.

Javier Ocaña of El País noted that whilst the depiction of the facet of the artist's biography pertaining his toxicomania is harmed in the fiction because of certain red lines set by his family, other sides of the film work, both from a purely artistic standpoint, acting-wise, and vis-à-vis the personality of Camarón.

Accolades 

|-
| align = "center" rowspan = "6" | 2006 || rowspan = "5" | 20th Goya Awards || Best Actor || Óscar Jaenada ||  || rowspan = "5" | 
|-
| Best Supporting Actress || Verónica Sánchez || 
|-
| Best Production Supervision || Tino Pont || 
|-
| Best Costume Design || María José Iglesias || 
|-
| Best Makeup and Hairstyles || Josefa Morales, Romana González || 
|-
| 15th Actors and Actresses Union Awards || Best Film Actor in a Leading Role || Óscar Jaenada ||  || align = "center" | 
|}

See also 
 List of Spanish films of 2005

References 

Spanish biographical drama films
Spanish drama films
2005 drama films
2000s Spanish films
2000s Spanish-language films
Films directed by Jaime Chávarri
Films set in Spain
Films set in the 20th century